SS James W. Cannon was a Liberty ship built in the United States during World War II. She was named after James William Cannon, the founder of Cannon Mills Corporation.

Construction
James W. Cannon was laid down on 25 May 1944, under a Maritime Commission (MARCOM) contract, MC hull 2366, by J.A. Jones Construction, Brunswick, Georgia; she was sponsored by Mrs. Charles A. Cannon, daughter-in-law of James William Cannon, and launched on 12 July 1944.

History
She was allocated to the International Freigting Corp., on 26 July 1944. On 8 June 1950, she was laid up in the National Defense Reserve Fleet in Astoria, Oregon. On 12 January 1951, she was sold, to Pan Cargo Shipping Corp., for commercial use. She was renamed Transoceanic and later National Mariner. On 7 August 1961, she was sold to National Shipping & Trading Corp., who turned around and sold her to John Theodoracopoulos, on 6 September 1961, and flagged for Greece. She was scrapped in 1963.

References

Bibliography

 
 
 
 
 

 

Liberty ships
Ships built in Brunswick, Georgia
1944 ships
Astoria Reserve Fleet